Self-enquiry, also spelled self-inquiry (Sanskrit vichara, also called jnana-vichara or ), is the constant attention to the inner awareness of "I" or "I am" recommended by Ramana Maharshi as the most efficient and direct way of discovering the unreality of the "I"-thought.

Ramana Mahirishi taught that the "I"-thought will disappear and only "I-I" or self-awareness remains. This results in an "effortless awareness of being", and by staying with it this "I-I" gradually destroys the vasanas "which cause the 'I'-thought to rise," and finally the 'I'-thought never rises again, which is Self-realization or liberation.

Etymology
 Vichāra  (Sanskrit: विचार) means deliberation; its root is वि (prefix to verbs and nouns it expresses) – चर्  (to move, roam, obtain knowledge of). It is the faculty of discrimination between right and wrong; it is deliberation about cause and effect, and the final analysis; it is also the enquiry into the nature of the Atman, Satya, Ishvara and Brahman. This Sanskrit word, Vichāra, does not have a corresponding word in English. Vichāra is reflection and contemplation upon the meaning of Vedantic truths, and leads the individual to true knowledge, it leads to Brahman, the Universal Self.

Ātman (IAST: ātman, Sanskrit: आत्मन्) is a Sanskrit word that is usually translated as "self". The root *ēt-men (breath) is cognate with Old English "æþm", Greek "asthma", German "Atem": "atmen" (to breathe). It is derived from Latin "anima" (breath, soul), which is cognate to Sanskrit "ánilaḥ" (wind). Although "ánilaḥ" and "ātman" have similar meaning, they are not etymologically related.

In Hindu philosophy, especially in the Vedanta school of Hinduism, Ātman is the first principle, the true self of an individual beyond identification with phenomena, the essence of an individual. To attain salvation (liberation), a human being must acquire self-knowledge (atma jnana), which is to realise that one's true self (Ātman) is identical with the transcendent self Brahman (or paramatman).

Strictly speaking, "self-enquiry" is not the investigation of the "Self", "Atman", but of the "I", "aham" (Sanskrit), "nan" (Tamil).

Origins

Ramana Maharshi
Ramana's teachings on Self-enquiry originated in his own awakening at age 16, when he became firmly aware of death. It made him aware of the Self. Ramana summarised his insight into "aham sphurana" (Self-awareness) to a visitor in 1945:

At first, Ramana thought that he was possessed by a spirit, "which had taken up residence in his body". This feeling remained for several weeks.

Later in life, he called his death experience akrama mukti, "sudden liberation", as opposed to the krama mukti, "gradual liberation" as in the Vedanta path of jnana yoga: will shine forth of its own accord. It is an awareness that is single and undivided, the thoughts which are many and divided having disappeared. If one remains still without leaving it, even the sphurana – having completely annihilated the sense of the individuality, the form of the ego, 'I am the body' — will itself in the end subside, just like the flame that catches the camphor. This alone is said to be liberation by great ones and scriptures.}}

Transcription of Ramana's explanations
Early on, Ramana attracted devotees who would sit in his company, and ask him questions. Several devotees recorded the answers to their own specific questions, or kept the sheets of paper on which Ramana answered, and had them later published. Other devotees recorded the talks between Ramana and devotees, a large amount of which have also been published.

Ramana "never felt moved to formulate his teaching of his own accord, either verbally or in writing". The few writings he's credited with "came into being as answers to questions asked by his disciples or through their urging". Only a few hymns were written on his own initiative.

Ramana's earliest teachings are documented in the book Nan Yar?(Who am I?), in which he elaborates on the "I" and Self-enquiry. The original book was first written in Tamil, and published by Sri Pillai. The essay version of the book (Sri Ramana Nutrirattu) prepared by Ramana is considered definitive, as unlike the original it had the benefit of his revision and review. "Nan Yar" was documented by his disciple M. Sivaprakasam Pillai, who was already heavily influenced by traditional Advaita, and so had added notes about the traditional Advaitic negation method for his own clarification; these additional notes were later removed by Ramana. A careful translation with notes is available in English as 'The Path of Sri Ramana, Part One' by Sri Sadhu Om, one of the direct disciples of Ramana.

See also

Hinduism
 Nisargadatta Maharaj
 Nididhyasana
 Siddharameshwar Maharaj
 Dŗg-Dŗśya-Viveka

Veerashaivism
 Allama Prabhu

Buddhism
 Anatman
 Milinda Panha
 Hua Tou
 Bassui Tokushō
 Chinul
 Mahamudra
 Subitism
 Shikantaza
Modern psychology
 Psychology of self

Notes

References

Sources

Printed sources

Web-sources

Further reading 
'Who Am I?', Collected Works of Sri Ramana Maharshi. Includes Nan yar, Who am I?i
Self-enquiry Meditation technique, inspired by the teachings of Sri Ramana Maharshi 
Be As You Are: The Teachings of Sri Ramana Maharshi, Edited by David Godman
Annamalai Swami: Final Talks, Edited by David Godman

External links

Guru Vachaka Kovai, by Sri Murugunar, Translation by Sadhu Om and Michael James free e-book

Meditation
Vedanta
Hindu philosophical concepts
Nondualism
Advaita